The 1991–92 UMass Minutemen basketball team represented the University of Massachusetts Amherst during the 1991–92 NCAA Division I men's basketball season. The Minutemen, led by fourth year head coach John Calipari, played their home games at Curry Hicks Cage and were members of the Atlantic 10 Conference. They finished the season 30–5, 13–3 in A-10 play to finish in first place. The Minutemen won the A-10 Conference tournament by beating West Virginia in the finals. They were awarded a #3 seed in the NCAA tournament. The Minutemen advanced to the Sweet Sixteen, losing to #2 seed Kentucky in the East Regional semifinal.

Roster

Schedule

|-
!colspan=9 style="background:#881C1C; color:white;"| Regular season

|-
!colspan=9 style="background:#881c1c; color:#FFFFFF;"| Atlantic 10 tournament

|-
!colspan=9 style="background:#881c1c; color:#FFFFFF;"| NCAA tournament

Rankings

References

UMass Minutemen basketball seasons
UMass
Umass